Fuk Wat They Talkin Bout is a mixtape by American rapper Tyga. It was released on August 24, 2015, by Last Kings Records.

Track listing 

Notes
 Two years after its release, "$timulated" was removed from streaming services.

Weekly charts

References

2015 albums
Tyga albums
Empire Distribution albums
Albums produced by Boi-1da
Albums produced by Cool & Dre
Albums produced by Zaytoven
Albums produced by Kanye West
Albums produced by Sean Combs
Albums produced by Young Chop
Albums produced by Sap (producer)
Albums produced by FKi (production team)